Mackay Harbour is a coastal locality in the Mackay Region, Queensland, Australia.

Geography 
The locality of Mackay Harbour is bounded to the east by the Coral Sea and to the south by the Pioneer River. The Port of Mackay is located on the oceanside supported by a number of associated industrial facilities.

There is also a residential and tourism development called Mackay Marina with 479 marina berths.

History 

When Mackay was first settled, ships came into port in the Pioneer River. However, by 1884, there were problems accommodating larger ships in the river. Although a new port had been desired since 1887, there was no progress in building one until l the Australian Government provided a grant of £250,000 and a loan of £1,000,000 in 1933. Work started on the port with the laying of a foundation stone on 14 September 1935. On 27 August 1939, the new deep water port was officially opened by Queensland Premier William Forgan Smith. It was an occasion for extensive celebrations in Mackay.In 1989 a bulk sugar terminal was opened and became the largest storage facility for sugar in the world.

In 1989, the Mackay Marina opened on the Harbour Beach shoreline with the Marina Village being a residential and tourist precinct.

Economy 
The Port of Mackay is the fourth largest multi-commodity port in Queensland, servicing both the mining and agricultural industries in Central Queensland. The port has one of the world's largest bulk sugar terminals, reflecting the extensive sugarcane industry in and around the Mackay Region. Coal from the Bowen Basin and Galilee Basin is exported through the port.

In the 2017-2018 financial year, the port handled over 3 million tonnes of cargo, including 1,573,629 tonnes of fuel, 876,519 tonnes of sugar and 148,245 tonnes of grain.

References

External links 

 

Mackay Region
Coastline of Queensland
Localities in Queensland